The IZh-94 (also known as MP-94) is a Russian double-barreled shotgun.

History 
IZh-94 was designed in 1992 as a successor to the IZh-27.

In September 2008, all Izhevsk Mechanical Plant firearms were renamed and IZh-94 got the name MP-94 (Mechanical Plant-94).

Design 
IZh-94 is an over and under hammerless shotgun, with one barrel above the other. The barrels are detachable. The weapon based on the design of IZh-27M shotgun

It has a walnut or beech stock and fore-end.

All variants of IZh-94 have iron sights and scope base for optical sight is available.

Variants 
 IZh-94 (ИЖ-94) - smoothbore shotgun
 IZh-94 "Sever" (ИЖ-94 "Север") - combination gun, .20 gauge barrel over 5.6 mm rifled barrel (.22 LR, .22 WMR or 5.6×39mm)
 IZh-94 "Taiga" (ИЖ-94 "Тайга") - combination gun, .12 gauge barrel (.12/70mm or .12/76 mm Magnum) over 7.62 mm caliber rifled barrel (7.62×39mm, .308 Winchester or 7.62×54mmR)
 IZh-94 "Express" (ИЖ-94 "Экспресс") - double-barreled rifle
 IZh-94 "Scout" (ИЖ-94 "Скаут") - lightweight combination gun (2.76 kg), .410 bore and .22 LR. The first rifle was introduced in January 2002.

Users 

  - is allowed as civilian hunting weapon
  - is allowed as civilian hunting weapon
  - is allowed as civilian hunting weapon
  - is allowed as civilian hunting weapon
  - the import was allowed and IZh-94 were sold as the Remington SPR94

Museum exhibits 
 one IZh-94 shotgun is in collection of Tula State Arms Museum in Tula Kremlin

References

Sources 
 Ружьё охотничье комбинированное ИЖ-94. Паспорт ЕИФЮ.776313.002 ПС
 ИЖ-94 // журнал "Мастер ружьё", № 9 (78), 2003.
 Двуствольное комбинированное ружьё MP-94 Север / Izhevsk Mechanical Plant official website

.22 LR firearms
5.6×39mm firearms
7.62×39mm firearms
7.62×54mmR firearms
Double-barreled shotguns of Russia
Combination guns
Izhevsk Mechanical Plant products
Weapons and ammunition introduced in 1993